Obervogau is a former municipality in the district of Leibnitz in the Austrian state of Styria. Since the 2015 Styria municipal structural reform, it is part of the municipality Straß in Steiermark.

Geography 
Obervogau lies in a bend of the Mur river in southern Styria.

References

Cities and towns in Leibnitz District